Dan Burlin (born 13 August 1980) is a Swedish former professional footballer who played as a midfielder. He spent the 2009 season on loan to Djurgårdens IF. He played for Åtvidabergs FF in Superettan during the 2003 season.

References

Living people
1980 births
Association football midfielders
Swedish footballers
Allsvenskan players
Superettan players
Skellefteå FF players
Åtvidabergs FF players
Umeå FC players
Djurgårdens IF Fotboll players